California's 8th district may refer to:

 California's 8th congressional district
 California's 8th State Assembly district
 California's 8th State Senate district